Gabriel Campisi is an American producer, screenwriter, director and author.

Campisi began making Super 8mm movies at the age of 8, and received his first recognition at Chicago's Photographic Society of America Teenage Film Festival at the age of 16 for his short film The Lost Creature, a project that mixed live action with stop-motion animation. He got his professional start in Hollywood as a Production Assistant after graduating high school, and quickly worked his way up the ladder to writing and directing national commercials and pop-star music videos for MTV.  He continued to shoot short films that received international attention and awards for his use of special effects, including The Law, the story of a man on the run from the notorious Men in Black of UFO folklore.

Campisi is the screenwriter of the motion picture Little Dead Rotting Hood, starring Eric Balfour, Bianca A. Santos, Romeo Miller, Patrick Muldoon, Heather Tom and Marina Sirtis, the author of the first and second editions of the book The Independent Filmmaker's Guide to Writing a Business Plan for Investors, published by McFarland & Company, and the editor-in-chief of the comic book 17 & Life: Jailbait, which was turned into a feature motion picture in 2014 by Los Angeles-based studios Cinedigm and The Asylum.

His latest book, The Independent Filmmaker's Guide to the New Hollywood - Success in the Era of Netflix and Streaming Video, also by McFarland & Company, features exclusive interviews with over a dozen prominent filmmakers and executive producers, including Val Hill (Blade Runner 2049, 12 Strong), Pen Densham (Harriet, The Last Full Measure), Patrick Lussier (Trick, Terminator Genisys, My Bloody Valentine), Joel Soisson (The Prophecy series, Children of the Corn series, Hellraiser series, Bill & Ted's Excellent Adventure), Larry Kasanoff (True Lies, Mortal Kombat series, Terminator 2), and David Rimawi (Black Summer, Z Nation, Sharknado series).

Some of the movies Campisi has produced include The Horde, featuring Bill Moseley, Costas Mandylor, Nestor Serrano, Vernon Wells and Matt Willig, Arlo the Burping Pig, featuring Drake Bell and Joey Lawrence, Buddy Hutchins, starring Jamie Kennedy and Sally Kirkland, Wishing For A Dream, starring Sara Malakul Lane, School's Out, featuring Jason London, Eric Roberts, David Chokachi and Nick Swardson, Blue Line, starring Tom Sizemore and Jordan Ladd, and Pinwheel, featuring the last performance by Ox Baker. He also appears as himself in the feature documentary, More Than Miyagi: The Pat Morita Story.

He is a member of the Producers Guild of America.

Filmography

Books

References

External links
 
 http://www.gabrielcampisi.com/
http://www.secretstorment.com
Gabriel Campisi on Amazon

1968 births
Living people
American film producers
American male screenwriters
American film directors